István Imai is a Hungarian sprint canoer who competed in the early 1980s. He won a bronze medal in the K-4 500 m event at the 1983 ICF Canoe Sprint World Championships in Tampere.

References

Hungarian male canoeists
Living people
Year of birth missing (living people)
ICF Canoe Sprint World Championships medalists in kayak